DeBary is a city in Volusia County, Florida, United States, on the eastern shore of the St. Johns River near Lake Monroe. According to the 2020 U.S. Census, the city had a population of 20,696. It is part of the Deltona–Daytona Beach–Ormond Beach, FL metropolitan statistical area, which was home to 553,284 people in 2019.

History
The Timucuan Indians once lived in the vicinity of Lake Monroe, where the domain of Chief Utina extended to just north of Lake George.  They hunted, fished, and gathered plants and berries from the forest.  By 1760, however, the Timucua had disappeared and been replaced by the Seminole tribe from Alabama and Georgia.  Florida was acquired from Spain in 1821, but the Seminole Wars delayed settlement.  In 1866, Elijah Watson of Enterprise sold land to Oliver and Amanda Arnett on the northern shore of the St. Johns River at Lake Monroe, where they built a house.

The couple in turn sold  in 1871 to (Samuel) Frederick deBary, a wealthy wine merchant from New York City, and that same year, he erected a hunting lodge.  Called "DeBary Hall", the 8,000-sq-ft (700-m2), 20-room Italianate mansion featured a two-tiered veranda, stables, an ice house, and the state's first swimming pool, fed by a spring.  Visitors included Presidents Ulysses S. Grant and Grover Cleveland.  Over time, he acquired an additional , planting orange groves and pecan trees. Some debate remains as to whether this was actually the first pool in Florida, as a St. Augustine pool has also made the same claim.  One possibility is that this was the first spring-fed pool in the state, 
In 1875, deBary bought a small steamboat, the George M. Bird, to transport his horses and dogs along the St. Johns River for hunting expeditions, and also to take fruit to market.  He established the DeBary Merchants' Line in 1876, a steamship service contracted to carry mail between Jacksonville and Enterprise.  It acquired the sidewheeler Frederick DeBary.  In 1883, the firm merged with the Baya Line, owned by Colonel H.T. Baya, to create the DeBary-Baya Merchants' Line, with 13 steamboats and a crew of 3,000 running to Sanford.  The DeBary-Baya Merchants' Line sold its business in 1889 to the Clyde Line, which survived until 1928.

Frederick deBary died in 1898, and his mansion is today a restored museum, listed on the National Register of Historic Places in 1972. Incorporated in 1993, the City of DeBary is named for its noted settler.

Geography

Demographics

As of the census of 2020,  22,628 people, 8,235 households resided in the City. In 2010, the population density was 1018 inhabitants per square mile (329.7/km).  The racial makeup of the city was 84.3% White, 7% African American, 0.10% Native American, 2.5% Asian,  and 2.5% from two or more races. Hispanics or Latinos of any race were 14.7% of the population.

Of the 8,235 households, 16.8% had children under the age of 18 living with them. The average family size was 2.54.

In 2010, the population was distributed as 20.0% under the age of 18, 4.9% from 18 to 24, 24.9% from 25 to 44, 27.2% from 45 to 64, and 23.0% who were 65 years of age or older. The median age was 45 years. For every 100 females, there were 92.1 males. For every 100 females age 18 and over, there were 88.3 males.

The median income for a household in the city was $71,554.

Public transportation

Bus
DeBary is served by VOTRAN's #23,#31, #32, and #33 routes.

Rail

DeBary is served by SunRail, the Central Florida commuter rail system.

Parks and recreation 
DeBary boasts several large parks and open land, each serving several outdoor activities.

City parks
 Alexandra Park
 Bill Keller Park
 Community Park
 Eagle's Nest Park
 Gateway Park
 Memorial Park
 Power Park
 River City Nature Park
 Rob Sullivan Park
Volusia County parks
 DeBary Hall
 Gemini Springs Park
 Lake Monroe Park

Notable people

 Luke Delaney (born 1979), astronaut
 Keith Greene (born 1992), professional golfer

Education 

Public primary and secondary education is handled by Volusia County Schools. The one elementary school in DeBary is DeBary Elementary. Students attend middle and high schools in the nearby cities of Deltona and Orange City.

References

External links

 City of DeBary
 DeBary Historic Trail
 DeBary Hall Historic Site

 
Cities in Volusia County, Florida
Greater Orlando
Populated places on the St. Johns River
Populated places established in 1993
Cities in Florida
Former census-designated places in Florida
1993 establishments in Florida